is a Japanese illustrator.
She was nominated for Lürzer's Archive 200 Best Illustrators worldwide in 2006.

She works for magazines, newspapers, and for advertising.

External links
official site
microjournal
visual poetry at Empty Mirror

Japanese illustrators
Living people
Year of birth missing (living people)
Place of birth missing (living people)